In oceanography, sea state is the general condition of the free surface on a large body of water—with respect to wind waves and swell—at a certain location and moment. A sea state is characterized by statistics, including the wave height, period, and spectrum. The sea state varies with time, as the wind and swell conditions change. The sea state can be assessed either by an experienced observer (like a trained mariner) or by using instruments like weather buoys, wave radar or remote sensing satellites.

In the case of buoy measurements, the statistics are determined for a time interval in which the sea state can be considered to be constant. This duration has to be much longer than the individual wave period, but shorter than the period in which the wind and swell conditions can be expected to vary significantly. Typically, records of one hundred to one thousand wave periods are used to determine the wave statistics.

The large number of variables involved in creating and describing the sea state cannot be quickly and easily summarized, so simpler scales are used to give an approximate but concise description of conditions for reporting in a ship's log or similar record.

WMO sea state code

The World Meteorological Organization (WMO) sea state code largely adopts the 'wind sea' definition of the Douglas Sea Scale.

The direction from which the swell is coming should be recorded.

Sea states in marine engineering 
In engineering applications, sea states are often characterized by the following two parameters:

 The significant wave height H1/3  — the mean wave height of the highest third of the waves.
 The mean wave period, T1.

In addition to the short-term wave statistics presented above, long-term sea state statistics are often given as a joint frequency table of the significant wave height and the mean wave period. From the long and short-term statistical distributions, it is possible to find the extreme values expected in the operating life of a ship. A ship designer can find the most extreme sea states (extreme values of H1/3 and T1) from the joint frequency table, and from the wave spectrum, the designer can find the most likely highest wave elevation in the most extreme sea states and predict the most likely highest loads on individual parts of the ship from the response amplitude operators of the ship. Surviving the once in 100 years or once in 1000 years sea state is a normal demand for design of ships and offshore structures.

See also  
 Beaufort scale
 Cross sea
 Douglas sea scale

Footnotes

References 
 
 

Oceanography
Meteorological phenomena
Marine meteorology